The First International is an alternate name for the International Workingmen's Association, an international organisation of left-wing radicals founded in 1864.

First International may also refer to:
 IWA–AIT or International Workers' Association, an anarcho-syndicalist federation of trade unions founded in 1922
 First International Syndicalist Congress, a meeting of European and Latin American syndicalists in London in 1913
 First International Conference of American States
 First International Eugenics Conference, a conference of eugenicists in London in 1912.
 International Peace Congress, an 1848 peace convention
 Aramaic Music Festival, also known as the "First International Aramaic Music Festival"

In business:
 First International Computer, a Taiwanese computer company
 First International Telecom, a Taiwanese mobile phone operator

In religion:
 First International Congress on World Evangelization
 International Bahá'í Council

In banking:
 First International Bank, an American bank founded in 1910
 First International Bank of Israel, an Israeli bank founded in 1972
 First International Bank Tower, the building which houses the Israeli bank